Hýsly is a municipality and village in Hodonín District in the South Moravian Region of the Czech Republic. It has about 400 inhabitants.

History
The first written mention of Hýsly is in a deed of bishop Jindřich Zdík from 1141.

References

External links

Villages in Hodonín District
Moravian Slovakia